RAWGraphs is a web-based open-source data visualization software made in JavaScript. It employs D3.js for the creation of editable visualizations in SVG format.

History

The project was started in 2013 by a group of researchers of Politecnico di Milano with the original name of "RAW". Version 1.0.0 was released in 2014. In the same year the tool won the "Most Beautiful" award at the Kantar Information is Beautiful Awards 2014 organized by David McCandless.

In 2017 the project was re-launched thanks to private support. It changed the license from LGPL to Apache 2 and the project name to "RAWGraphs".

In August 2019 the team launched a crowdfunding campaign to harvest economical support for developing a new version of the tool. Version 2.0.0 was released in September 2020 to backers, and  publicly in February 2021.
The new version presents a modular architecture composed by a core JavaScript library, an expandable library of visual models, and a web-based GUI written in React.

Applications 

RAWGraphs has been used in a number of research projects in academia, and is used also by journalist and graphic designer thanks to its ability of creating clean, SVG-based images that can be further edited with any other software.

Available charts 
In version 2.0 the available charts are:

 Alluvial diagram
 Arc diagram
 Bar chart
 Multi-set bar chart
 Stacked bar chart
 Beeswarm plot
 Box plot
 Bumpchart
 Circle packing
 Dendrograms:
 Circular dendrogram
 Linear dendrogram
 Gantt chart
 Horizon graph
 Line chart
 Matrix Plot
 Parallel coordinates
 Radar chart
 Sankey diagram
 Scatterplots:
 Bubble chart
 Contour plot over bubble chart
 Convex hull grouping
 Hexagonal binning grouping
 Streamgraph (also known as Area chart)
 Sunburst diagram
 Treemap
 Violin plot
 Voronoi Diagram

Data Inputs 

the software can load data from the following sources:
 static files (CSV, TSV, Excel files)
 Data from endpoints (in tabular or JSON format)
 Data from SPARQL endpoints (e.g. Wikidata)

References 

Free application software
Free data visualization software